Thomas Anderson was an English footballer. His only known club was Blackpool, for whom he made two Football League appearances in 1903.

References

19th-century births
20th-century deaths
English footballers
Blackpool F.C. players
Place of birth missing
Place of death missing
English Football League players
Association football inside forwards